Quảng Lâm may refer to several places in Vietnam, including:

 , a rural commune of Bảo Lâm District.
 , a rural commune of Đầm Hà District.
 Quảng Lâm, Điện Biên, a rural commune of Mường Nhé District.